SS Raymond V. Ingersoll was a Liberty ship built in the United States during World War II. She was named after Raymond V. Ingersoll, borough president of Brooklyn from 1934 to 1940.

Construction 
Raymond V. Ingersoll was laid down on 27 July 1944, under a Maritime Commission (MARCOM) contract, MC hull 2317, by J.A. Jones Construction, Panama City, Florida; and launched on 31 August 1944.

History
She was allocated to Polarus Steamship Company, 18 September 1944. On 3 June 1946, she was laid up in the National Defense Reserve Fleet, Hudson River Reserve Fleet, Jones Point, New York.

Reallocated to Polarus Steamship Company, 12 July 1946. Placed in National Defense Reserve Fleet, Mobile, Alabama, 17 October 1946.

She was sold, on 6 February 1947, to Rich. Amlie & Co., for $599,309.36 and commercial use. She was flagged in Norway and renamed Sneland I. In 1959, she was sold to the Polish Government, allocated to the Polish Steamship Co., and renamed Kopalnia Zabrze. She was converted to a floating warehouse in 1975, and renamed MP-ZP-GDY-8, until being scrapped in 1982.

References

Bibliography 

 
 
 
 

 

Liberty ships
Ships built in Panama City, Florida
1944 ships
Hudson River Reserve Fleet
Mobile Reserve Fleet